Abu Youssef Sharqieh is the leader of Jund al-Sham and former Fatah official.  Abu Youssef Sharqieh is called "Prince of the Sharia".  He is said to rarely leave his home but has established himself as an important figure in the area of Ain al-Hilweh, Lebanon.  Jund Ash Sham claims that Sharqieh was tortured in the Palestinian camp of Nahr al-Bared.

References 

Year of birth missing (living people)
Living people
Lebanese politicians
Fatah members
Lebanese torture victims